Gdańsk Strzyża railway station is a railway station serving the city of Gdańsk, in the Pomeranian Voivodeship, Poland. The station opened on 1 September 2015 and is located on the Gdańsk Wrzeszcz–Gdańsk Osowa railway. The station is located in the Strzyża district of the city. The train services are operated by SKM Tricity as part of the Pomorska Kolej Metropolitalna (PKM).

History
The Gdańsk Wrzeszcz–Stara Piła railway passed the site where the station is located today. A viaduct over the road existed then too, but was blown up by the Germans on 26 March 1945, to slow down the movement of the Soviets. The remnants of the viaduct, either side of the road, stayed in a derelict state for years. These were demolished in 2013 to make way for the building work on for the new PKM.

Train services
The station is served by the following services:

Pomorska Kolej Metropolitalna services (R) Gdynia Główna — Gdańsk Osowa — Gdańsk Port Lotniczy (Airport) — Gdańsk Wrzeszcz
Pomorska Kolej Metropolitalna services (R) Kartuzy — Gdańsk Port Lotniczy (Airport) — Gdańsk Główny 
Pomorska Kolej Metropolitalna services (R) Kościerzyna — Gdańsk Port Lotniczy (Airport) — Gdańsk Wrzeszcz — Gdynia Główna

Public transport
Tram stop Strzyża PKM is located close to the station. The following services call here:

2, 3, 4, 5, 6, 7, 8, 9, 10, 11, 12, N4, N13

References 

 This article is based upon a translation of the Polish language version as of November 2016.

External links

Railway stations in Poland opened in 2015
Strzyza